The National Conservative Presbyterian Church in Mexico is a Christian denomination in Mexico.

Origin 
It was founded in 1954 when a conflict within the National Presbyterian Church in Mexico led the formation of this denomination. It was established by Eleazar Z. Perez, pastor of El Divido Parish.

The National Presbytery of Mexico City worked independently from the National Presbyterian Church in Mexico from 1954. It adopted the name National Conservative Presbyterian Church in Mexico. This denomination consisted of one solely presbytery until October 16, 1996, when 2 presbyteries was organised and the first General Assembly was held. The National Conservative Presbyterian Church in Mexico differ from the National Presbyterian Church in Mexico for his stance of the preservation of pure doctrine, not included modernism, ecumenism, charismatism. In 2004 there were 1,600 members in the denomination, and 20 ordained clergy.

Theology 
Apostles Creed
Nicene Creed
Westminster Confession of Faith
Westminster Shorter Catechism
Westminster Larger Catechism

Statistics 
The church currently has 63 congregations and 3 presbyteries, these are the Mexico City presbytery, the Eastern Mexico National Presbytery and the Western National Presbytery.

References

External links 
Official website of the National Conservative Presbyterian Church in Mexico

Presbyterian denominations in Mexico
Protestantism in Mexico
Presbyterian denominations established in the 20th century
Christian organizations established in 1954
Fundamentalist denominations